Seyed Saber Mirghorbani (born September 17, 1983 in Babolsar, Iran) is an Iranian football player.

Club career

Club career statistics

 Assist Goals

International career
Saber Mirghorbani was called up to the Iran national football team in June 2007 for the West Asian Football Federation Championship 2007. He made his debut for Iran in a match vs Palestine.

References

External links

Iranian footballers
Iran international footballers
Association football forwards
Sanat Mes Kerman F.C. players
Sanat Naft Abadan F.C. players
People from Babolsar
1983 births
Living people
PAS Hamedan F.C. players
Fajr Sepasi players
Saipa F.C. players
Persian Gulf Pro League players
Azadegan League players
Sportspeople from Mazandaran province